Marszałki may refer to the following places:
Marszałki, Greater Poland Voivodeship (west-central Poland)
Marszałki, Opole Voivodeship (south-west Poland)
Marszałki, Warmian-Masurian Voivodeship (north Poland)